Phragmataecia innotata is a species of moth of the family Cossidae.

The moth is found in China, Vietnam, Laos, and Thailand.

References

External links

Phragmataecia
Moths of Asia
Moths described in 1865